Cobus Visagie (born 31 October 1973) is a South African former rugby union footballer who played at tighthead prop.

Early life
Visagie attended the Paul Roos Gymnasium in Stellenbosch and then studied Auditing and Accounting at Stellenbosch University, where he also played for Maties (Stellenbosch University) and Western Province Rugby representing the under–20 and under–21 teams.

Visagie finished his Bachelor of Commerce, majoring in Accounting and Audit at Stellenbosch University in 1996. He worked seven years for PricewaterhouseCoopers as a Chartered Accountant, whilst playing professional rugby.

Playing career

Visagie won three Currie Cups with Western Province Rugby, the last in 2001 with a home win (at Newlands, Cape Town) over the Natal Sharks. He also earned 46 Super 12 caps with the Stormers. He earned 29 caps for his country and was part of the Springbok team that reached the 1999 Rugby World Cup Semi Final. He was selected to the team of the tournament with fellow Springbok frontrow Os du Randt.

Visagie moved to the United Kingdom to play for the English Premiership club Saracens after being passed over for the 2003 World Cup Springbok squad. He played 121 games for Saracens and was voted into the Guinness Premiership team of the season for three consecutive years. He also represented the Barbarians (8 caps), World XV (3 caps) and the Southern Hemisphere XV that played in the Tsunami Relief game at Twickenham, before retiring from professional rugby in May 2009.

Test history

Later career
Visagie joined Premier Team Holdings Limited as Commercial Director of the Group of four companies based in the United Kingdom. In 2011, he was appointed Principal for Africa at Templewood Merchant Bank. The following year, he co-founded Africa Merchant Capital, based in London to focus exclusively on corporate finance advisory, private equity deal origination and syndication in Sub-Saharan Africa.

Accolades
Visagie was one of the five South African Rugby players of the Year for 1999, along with Breyton Paulse, Joost van der Westhuizen,  Hennie le Roux and the eventual winner of Player of the Year, Andre Venter.

See also
List of South Africa national rugby union players – Springbok no. 683

References

External links

Saracens profile
Vrydagaand/Saterdagaand (2008)
 http://www.sporting-heroes.net/rugby/south-africa/cobus-visagie-3057/international-rugby-matches_a04571/

\

South African rugby union players
Afrikaner people
South Africa international rugby union players
Stormers players
Western Province (rugby union) players
Saracens F.C. players
Barbarian F.C. players
Living people
1973 births
Place of birth missing (living people)
Doping cases in rugby union
Alumni of Paul Roos Gymnasium
Stellenbosch University alumni
Rugby union players from the Western Cape
Rugby union props